The 2015 Southland Conference women's basketball tournament, a part of the 2014–15 NCAA Division I women's basketball season, will take place March 11–14, 2015 at the Merrell Center in Katy, Texas. The winner of the tournament will receive the Southland Conference's automatic bid to the 2015 NCAA tournament.

Seeds & Regular Season Standings

Only the Top 8 teams advance to the Southland Conference tournament. If a team ineligible for the NCAA Tourney should finish in the top 8, their seed will fall to the next eligible team. Abilene Christian and Incarnate Word are ineligible for post-season play as they are in the second year of a 4-year transition from D2 to D1. They won't be eligible for the Southland tourney until 2018. This chart shows all the teams records and standings and explains why teams advanced to the conference tourney or finished in certain tiebreaking positions.

Source:

Schedule

Bracket

Game Summaries

Awards and honors
Source:  

Tournament MVP: Beatrice Attura – Northwestern State

All-Tournament Teams:

 Beatrice Attura – Northwestern State
 Janelle Perez – Northwestern State
 Porscha Rogers – Stephen F. Austin
 Erin McGarrachan – Houston Baptist
 Tayler Jefferson – Houston Baptist

See also
2015 Southland Conference men's basketball tournament
Southland Conference women's basketball tournament

References

External links
  2015 Southland Conference Men's and Women's Tournament Page

Southland Conference women's basketball tournament
2014–15 Southland Conference women's basketball season
Southland Conference Women's basketball